Joseph H. McKinley Jr. (born 1954) is a senior United States district judge of the United States District Court for the Western District of Kentucky.

Early life and education

Born in Owensboro, Kentucky, McKinley received a Bachelor of Science degree from the University of Kentucky in 1976 and a Juris Doctor from the University of Louisville School of Law in 1979.

Career

McKinley was in private practice in Owensboro from 1979 to 1991. He was a Commissioner, Kentucky Oil and Gas Conservation Commission from 1982 to 1990. He was an Assistant county attorney of Daviess County, Kentucky from 1985 to 1987. He was a Hearing Officer, Natural Resources and Environmental Protection Cabinet from 1990 to 1991. McKinley was a judge on the Daviess County Circuit Court, Division I, Kentucky from 1992 to 1995.

Federal judicial service

McKinley is a United States District Judge of the United States District Court for the Western District of Kentucky. McKinley was nominated by President Bill Clinton on May 24, 1995, to a seat vacated by Ronald E. Meredith. He was confirmed by the United States Senate on August 11, 1995, and received his commission on August 14, 1995. He served as chief judge of the court from November 15, 2011 to November 15, 2018. He assumed senior status on June 9, 2019.

Sources
 

1954 births
Living people
People from Owensboro, Kentucky
University of Kentucky alumni
University of Louisville School of Law alumni
Judges of the United States District Court for the Western District of Kentucky
United States district court judges appointed by Bill Clinton
20th-century American judges
21st-century American judges